Chah Cheragh (also Romanized as Chāh Cherāgh) is a village in Dowreh Rural District, Chegeni District, Dowreh County, Lorestan Province, Iran. At the 2006 census, its population was 150, in 31 families.

References 

Towns and villages in Dowreh County